The QBS-09 semi-automatic shotgun, also known as the Type 09 shotgun, is a semi-automatic shotgun developed by Norinco of the People's Republic of China.

Design and development

The initial development of the QBS-09 dates back to 1989, with the project officially established in 2005. Multiple prototypes were created between 2005 and 2007, including one featuring an internal tube design, and a conventional magazine-fed design.

The QBS-09 uses specifically designed DBD-09 18.4mm tungsten alloy anti-personnel buckshot. The round is loaded with 14 pellets of high-density tungsten alloy buckshot set into plastic container with steel-case. Tungsten alloy is used as the penetration level of the lead pellets were unable to meet the PLA requirement. Each pellet is made of tungsten alloy ball of 5.3mm (~0.2“) in diameter, 1.4 gram (~22 grains) in weight.

The length of the round is 65mm and the whole round weighs 44 grams. The muzzle velocity is reported at 420 m/s (1380 fps), with an effective range of up to 100 meters. Due to the DBD-09 round generating high-impulse recoil, the QBS09 shotgun is equipped with a spring-buffered shoulder stock, which retracts every time the gun fires.

The Type 10 rubber round is also available as a less-lethal option. The Type 10 round weighs 33.96～39.66g, containing 28 rubber pellets with a diameter of 7.2mm. The Type 10 paintball gun is also available for law enforcement usage.

Users
: People's Liberation Army, People's Armed Police

References

Shotguns of the People's Republic of China
Semi-automatic shotguns